This is a list of the bird species recorded in the Philippines. The avifauna of the Philippines include a total of 741 species, of which 229 are endemic, five have been introduced by humans.

This list's taxonomic treatment (designation and sequence of orders, families and species) and nomenclature (common and scientific names) follow the conventions of The Clements Checklist of Birds of the World, 2022 edition. The family accounts at the beginning of each heading reflect this taxonomy, as do the species counts found in each family account. Introduced and accidental species are included in the total counts for the Philippines.

The following tags have been used to highlight several categories. The commonly occurring native species do not fall into any of these categories.

 (A) Accidental: a species that rarely or accidentally occurs in the Philippines
 (E) Endemic: a species endemic to the Philippines
 (I) Introduced: a species introduced to the Philippines as a consequence, direct or indirect, of human actions

Ducks, geese, and waterfowl
Order: AnseriformesFamily: Anatidae

Anatidae includes the ducks and most duck-like waterfowl, such as geese and swans. These birds are adapted to an aquatic existence with webbed feet, flattened bills, and feathers that are excellent at shedding water due to an oily coating. 

Spotted whistling-duck, Dendrocygna guttata
Wandering whistling-duck, Dendrocygna arcuata
Bar-headed goose, Anser indicus (A)
Graylag goose, Anser anser (A)
Greater white-fronted goose, Anser albifrons (A)
Lesser white-fronted goose, Anser erythropus (A)
Taiga bean-goose, Anser fabalis (A)
Tundra bean-goose, Anser serrirostris (A)
Brant, Branta bernicla (A)
Tundra swan, Cygnus columbianus (A)
Ruddy shelduck, Tadorna ferruginea (A)
Common shelduck, Tadorna tadorna (A)
Cotton pygmy-goose, Nettapus coromandelianus (A)
Mandarin duck, Aix galericulata (A)
Baikal teal, Sibirionetta formosa (A)
Garganey, Spatula querquedula
Northern shoveler, Spatula clypeata
Gadwall, Mareca strepera (A)
Falcated duck, Mareca falcata (A)
Eurasian wigeon, Mareca penelope
Philippine duck, Anas luzonica (E)
Eastern spot-billed duck, Anas zonorhyncha (A)
Mallard, Anas platyrhynchos (A)
Northern pintail, Anas acuta
Green-winged teal, Anas crecca
Canvasback, Aythya valisineria (A)
Common pochard, Aythya ferina (A)
Ferruginous duck, Aythya nyroca (A)
Baer's pochard, Aythya baeri (A)
Tufted duck, Aythya fuligula
Greater scaup, Aythya marila (A)
Scaly-sided merganser, Mergus squamatus (A)

Megapodes
Order: GalliformesFamily: Megapodiidae

The Megapodiidae are stocky, medium-large chicken-like birds with small heads and large feet. All but the malleefowl occupy jungle habitats and most have brown or black coloring.

Tabon scrubfowl, Megapodius cumingii

Pheasants, grouse, and allies
Order: GalliformesFamily: Phasianidae

The Phasianidae are a family of terrestrial birds which consists of quails, partridges, snowcocks, francolins, spurfowls, tragopans, monals, pheasants, peafowls and jungle fowls. In general, they are plump (although they vary in size) and have broad, relatively short wings.

Palawan peacock-pheasant, Polyplectron napoleonis (E)
Blue-breasted quail, Coturnix chinensis
Japanese quail, Coturnix japonica (A)
Common quail, Coturnix coturnix (A)
Chinese francolin, Francolinus pintadeanus
Red junglefowl, Gallus gallus
Daurian partridge, Perdix dauurica

Grebes
Order: PodicipediformesFamily: Podicipedidae

Grebes are small to medium-large freshwater diving birds. They have lobed toes and are excellent swimmers and divers. However, they have their feet placed far back on the body, making them quite ungainly on land.

Little grebe, Tachybaptus ruficollis
Eared grebe, Podiceps nigricollis (A)

Pigeons and doves
Order: ColumbiformesFamily: Columbidae

Pigeons and doves are stout-bodied birds with short necks and short slender bills with a fleshy cere.

Rock pigeon, Columba livia (I)
Metallic pigeon, Columba vitiensis
Oriental turtle-dove, Streptopelia orientalis (A)
Philippine collared-dove, Streptopelia dusumieri
Red collared-dove, Streptopelia tranquebarica
Spotted dove, Spilopelia chinensis
Philippine cuckoo-dove, Macropygia tenuirostris
Asian emerald dove, Chalcophaps indica
Zebra dove, Geopelia striata (I)
Nicobar pigeon, Caloenas nicobarica
Mindoro bleeding-heart, Gallicolumba platenae (E)
Negros bleeding-heart, Gallicolumba keayi (E)
Sulu bleeding-heart, Gallicolumba menagei (E)
Luzon bleeding-heart, Gallicolumba luzonica (E)
Mindanao bleeding-heart, Gallicolumba criniger (E)
White-eared brown-dove, Phapitreron leucotis (E)
Amethyst brown-dove, Phapitreron amethystina (E)
Mindanao brown-dove, Phapitreron brunneiceps (E)
Tawitawi brown-dove, Phapitreron cinereiceps (E)
Pink-necked green-pigeon, Treron vernans
Philippine green-pigeon, Treron axillaris
Thick-billed green-pigeon, Treron curvirostra
Gray-cheeked green-pigeon, Treron griseicauda
Whistling green-pigeon, Treron formosae
Yellow-breasted fruit-dove, Ptilinopus occipitalis (E)
Flame-breasted fruit-dove, Ptilinopus marchei (E)
Cream-breasted fruit dove, Ptilinopus merrilli (E)
Black-chinned fruit-dove, Ptilinopus leclancheri (E)
Superb fruit-dove, Ptilinopus superbus (A)
Black-naped fruit-dove, Ptilinopus melanospila
Negros fruit-dove, Ptilinopus arcanus (E)
Pink-bellied imperial-pigeon, Ducula poliocephala (E)
Mindoro imperial-pigeon, Ducula mindorensis (E)
Spotted imperial-pigeon, Ducula carola (E)
Green imperial-pigeon, Ducula aenea
Gray imperial-pigeon, Ducula pickeringii
Pied imperial-pigeon, Ducula bicolor

Cuckoos
Order: CuculiformesFamily: Cuculidae

The family Cuculidae includes cuckoos, roadrunners and anis. These birds are of variable size with slender bodies, long tails and strong legs. The Old World cuckoos are brood parasites.

Rufous coucal, Centropus unirufus (E)
Black-faced coucal, Centropus melanops (E)
Black-hooded coucal, Centropus steerii (E)
Greater coucal, Centropus sinensis
Philippine coucal, Centropus viridis (E)
Lesser coucal, Centropus bengalensis
Chestnut-breasted malkoha, Phaenicophaeus curvirostris
Red-crested malkoha, Dasylophus superciliosus (E)
Scale-feathered malkoha, Dasylophus cumingi (E)
Chestnut-winged cuckoo, Clamator coromandus
Pied cuckoo, Clamator jacobinus (A)
Asian koel, Eudynamys scolopacea
Channel-billed cuckoo, Scythrops novaehollandiae (A)
Violet cuckoo, Chrysococcyx xanthorhynchus
Little bronze-cuckoo, Chrysococcyx minutillus
Banded bay cuckoo, Cacomantis sonneratii (A)
Plaintive cuckoo, Cacomantis merulinus
Brush cuckoo, Cacomantis variolosus
Asian drongo-cuckoo, Surniculus lugubris
Philippine drongo-cuckoo, Surniculus velutinus (E)
Square-tailed drongo-cuckoo, Surniculus lugubris
Large hawk-cuckoo, Hierococcyx sparverioides
Philippine hawk-cuckoo, Hierococcyx pectoralis (E)
Indian cuckoo, Cuculus micropterus
Oriental cuckoo, Cuculus optatus

Frogmouths
Order: CaprimulgiformesFamily: Podargidae

The frogmouths are a group of nocturnal birds related to the nightjars. They are named for their large flattened hooked bill and huge frog-like gape, which they use to take insects.

Philippine frogmouth, Batrachostomus septimus (E)
Palawan frogmouth, Batrachostomus chaseni (E)

Nightjars and allies
Order: CaprimulgiformesFamily: Caprimulgidae

Nightjars are medium-sized nocturnal birds that usually nest on the ground. They have long wings, short legs and very short bills. Most have small feet, of little use for walking, and long pointed wings. Their soft plumage is camouflaged to resemble bark or leaves.

Great eared-nightjar, Lyncornis macrotis
Gray nightjar, Caprimulgus jotaka
Large-tailed nightjar, Caprimulgus macrurus
Philippine nightjar, Caprimulgus manillensis (E)
Savanna nightjar, Caprimulgus affinis

Swifts
Order: CaprimulgiformesFamily: Apodidae

Swifts are small birds which spend the majority of their lives flying. These birds have very short legs and never settle voluntarily on the ground, perching instead only on vertical surfaces. Many swifts have long swept-back wings which resemble a crescent or boomerang.

Philippine spinetailed swift, Mearnsia picina (E)
White-throated needletail, Hirundapus caudacutus
Brown-backed needletail, Hirundapus giganteus
Purple needletail, Hirundapus celebensis
Pygmy swiftlet, Collocalia troglodytes (E)
Gray-rumped swiftlet, Collocalia marginata
Ridgetop swiftlet, Collocalia isonota
Philippine swiftlet, Aerodramus mearnsi (E)
Whitehead's swiftlet, Aerodramus whiteheadi (E)
Ameline swiftlet, Aerodramus amelis 
Mossy-nest swiftlet, Aerodramus salangana
Black-nest swiftlet, Aerodramus maximus
White-nest swiftlet, Aerodramus fuciphagus
Germain's swiftlet, Aerodramus germani
Pacific swift, Apus pacificus
House swift, Apus nipalensis
Asian palm-swift, Cypsiurus balasiensis

Treeswifts
Order: CaprimulgiformesFamily: Hemiprocnidae

The treeswifts, also called crested swifts, are closely related to the true swifts. They differ from the other swifts in that they have crests, long forked tails and softer plumage.

Gray-rumped treeswift, Hemiprocne longipennis (A)
Whiskered treeswift, Hemiprocne comata

Rails, gallinules, and coots
Order: GruiformesFamily: Rallidae

Rallidae is a large family of small to medium-sized birds which includes the rails, crakes, coots and gallinules. Typically they inhabit dense vegetation in damp environments near lakes, swamps or rivers. In general they are shy and secretive birds, making them difficult to observe. Most species have strong legs and long toes which are well adapted to soft uneven surfaces. They tend to have short, rounded wings and to be weak fliers.

Slaty-breasted rail, Lewinia striata
Luzon rail, Lewinia mirifica (E)
Calayan rail, Gallirallus calayanensis (E)
Buff-banded rail, Gallirallus philippensis
Barred rail, Gallirallus torquatus
Eurasian moorhen, Gallinula chloropus
Eurasian coot, Fulica atra
Black-backed swamphen, Porphyrio indicus
Philippine swamphen, Porphyrio pulverulentus (E)
Watercock, Gallicrex cinerea
Plain bush-hen, Amaurornis olivacea (E)
White-breasted waterhen, Amaurornis phoenicurus
White-browed crake, Poliolimnas cinereus
Red-legged crake, Rallina fasciata
Slaty-legged crake, Rallina eurizonoides
Ruddy-breasted crake, Zapornia fusca
Baillon's crake, Zapornia pusilla
Spotless crake, Zapornia tabuensis

Cranes
Order: GruiformesFamily: Gruidae

Cranes are large, long-legged and long-necked birds. Unlike the similar-looking but unrelated herons, cranes fly with necks outstretched, not pulled back. Most have elaborate and noisy courting displays or "dances".

Demoiselle crane, Anthropoides virgo (A)
Sarus crane, Grus antigone
Hooded crane, Grus monacha (A)

Thick-knees
Order: CharadriiformesFamily: Burhinidae

The thick-knees are a group of largely tropical waders in the family Burhinidae. They are found worldwide within the tropical zone, with some species also breeding in temperate Europe and Australia. They are medium to large waders with strong black or yellow-black bills, large yellow eyes and cryptic plumage. Despite being classed as waders, most species have a preference for arid or semi-arid habitats.

Beach thick-knee, Esacus magnirostris

Stilts and avocets
Order: CharadriiformesFamily: Recurvirostridae

Recurvirostridae is a family of large wading birds, which includes the avocets and stilts. The avocets have long legs and long up-curved bills. The stilts have extremely long legs and long, thin, straight bills.

Black-winged stilt, Himantopus himantopus
Pied stilt, Himantopus leucocephalus
Pied avocet, Recurvirostra avosetta (A)

Oystercatchers
Order: CharadriiformesFamily: Haematopodidae

The oystercatchers are large and noisy plover-like birds, with strong bills used for smashing or prising open molluscs.

Eurasian oystercatcher, Haematopus ostralegus (A)

Plovers and lapwings
Order: CharadriiformesFamily: Charadriidae

The family Charadriidae includes the plovers, dotterels and lapwings. They are small to medium-sized birds with compact bodies, short, thick necks and long, usually pointed, wings. They are found in open country worldwide, mostly in habitats near water.

Black-bellied plover, Pluvialis squatarola
Pacific golden-plover, Pluvialis fulva
Northern lapwing, Vanellus vanellus (A)
Gray-headed lapwing, Vanellus cinereus (A)
Lesser sand-plover, Charadrius mongolus
Greater sand-plover, Charadrius leschenaultii
Malaysian plover, Charadrius peronii
Kentish plover, Charadrius alexandrinus
Common ringed plover, Charadrius hiaticula (A)
Semipalmated plover, Charadrius semipalmatus (A)
Long-billed plover, Charadrius placidus (A)
Little ringed plover, Charadrius dubius
Oriental plover, Charadrius veredus

Painted-snipes
Order: CharadriiformesFamily: Rostratulidae

Painted-snipe are short-legged, long-billed birds similar in shape to the true snipes, but more brightly colored.

Greater painted-snipe, Rostratula benghalensis

Jacanas
Order: CharadriiformesFamily: Jacanidae

The jacanas are a group of tropical waders in the family Jacanidae. They are found throughout the tropics. They are identifiable by their huge feet and claws which enable them to walk on floating vegetation in the shallow lakes that are their preferred habitat.

Comb-crested jacana, Irediparra gallinacea
Pheasant-tailed jacana, Hydrophasianus chirurgus

Sandpipers and allies
Order: CharadriiformesFamily: Scolopacidae

Scolopacidae is a large diverse family of small to medium-sized shorebirds including the sandpipers, curlews, godwits, shanks, tattlers, woodcocks, snipes, dowitchers and phalaropes. The majority of these species eat small invertebrates picked out of the mud or soil. Variation in length of legs and bills enables multiple species to feed in the same habitat, particularly on the coast, without direct competition for food.

Bristle-thighed curlew, Numenius tahitiensis (A)
Whimbrel, Numenius phaeopus
Little curlew, Numenius minutus
Far Eastern curlew, Numenius madagascariensis
Eurasian curlew, Numenius arquata
Bar-tailed godwit, Limosa lapponica
Black-tailed godwit, Limosa limosa
Ruddy turnstone, Arenaria interpres
Great knot, Calidris tenuirostris
Red knot, Calidris canutus
Ruff, Calidris pugnax
Broad-billed sandpiper, Calidris falcinellus
Sharp-tailed sandpiper, Calidris acuminata
Curlew sandpiper, Calidris ferruginea
Temminck's stint, Calidris temminckii
Long-toed stint, Calidris subminuta
Spoon-billed sandpiper, Calidris pygmea (A)
Red-necked stint, Calidris ruficollis
Sanderling, Calidris alba
Dunlin, Calidris alpina (A)
Little stint, Calidris minuta (A)
Pectoral sandpiper, Calidris melanotos (A)
Asian dowitcher, Limnodromus semipalmatus
Long-billed dowitcher, Limnodromus scolopaceus (A)
Jack snipe, Lymnocryptes minimus (A)
Bukidnon woodcock, Scolopax bukidnonensis (E)
Latham's snipe, Gallinago hardwickii
Common snipe, Gallinago gallinago
Pin-tailed snipe, Gallinago stenura
Swinhoe's snipe, Gallinago megala
Terek sandpiper, Xenus cinereus
Red-necked phalarope, Phalaropus lobatus
Red phalarope, Phalaropus fulicarius (A)
Common sandpiper, Actitis hypoleucos
Green sandpiper, Tringa ochropus
Gray-tailed tattler, Tringa brevipes
Spotted redshank, Tringa erythropus (A)
Common greenshank, Tringa nebularia
Nordmann's greenshank, Tringa guttifer
Marsh sandpiper, Tringa stagnatilis
Wood sandpiper, Tringa glareola
Common redshank, Tringa totanus

Buttonquail
Order: CharadriiformesFamily: Turnicidae

The buttonquail are small, drab, running birds which resemble the true quails. The female is the brighter of the sexes and initiates courtship. The male incubates the eggs and tends the young.

Small buttonquail, Turnix sylvatica
Spotted buttonquail, Turnix ocellata (E)
Barred buttonquail, Turnix suscitator
Luzon buttonquail, Turnix worcesteri (E)

Pratincoles and coursers
Order: CharadriiformesFamily: Glareolidae

Glareolidae is a family of wading birds comprising the pratincoles, which have short legs, long pointed wings and long forked tails, and the coursers, which have long legs, short wings and long, pointed bills which curve downwards.

Oriental pratincole, Glareola maldivarum

Skuas and jaegers
Order: CharadriiformesFamily: Stercorariidae

The family Stercorariidae are, in general, medium to large birds, typically with gray or brown plumage, often with white markings on the wings. They nest on the ground in temperate and arctic regions and are long-distance migrants.

Pomarine jaeger, Stercorarius pomarinus
Long-tailed jaeger, Stercorarius longicaudus (A)

Gulls, terns, and skimmers
Order: CharadriiformesFamily: Laridae

Laridae is a family of medium to large seabirds, the gulls, terns, and skimmers. Gulls are typically gray or white, often with black markings on the head or wings. They have stout, longish bills and webbed feet. Terns are a group of generally medium to large seabirds typically with gray or white plumage, often with black markings on the head. Most terns hunt fish by diving but some pick insects off the surface of fresh water. Terns are generally long-lived birds, with several species known to live in excess of 30 years.

Saunders's gull, Saundersilarus saundersi (A)
Black-headed gull, Chroicocephalus ridibundus
Little gull, Hydrocoloeus minutus (A)
Laughing gull, Leucophaeus atricilla (A)
Black-tailed gull, Larus crassirostris (A)
Common gull, Larus canus (A)
Herring gull, Larus argentatus (A)
Slaty-backed gull, Larus schistisagus (A)
Brown noddy, Anous stolidus
Black noddy, Anous minutus
White tern, Gygis alba (A)
Sooty tern, Onychoprion fuscatus
Bridled tern, Onychoprion anaethetus
Aleutian tern, Onychoprion aleuticus (A)
Little tern, Sternula albifrons
Gull-billed tern, Gelochelidon nilotica
Caspian tern, Hydroprogne caspia (A)
White-winged tern, Chlidonias leucopterus
Whiskered tern, Chlidonias hybrida
Roseate tern, Sterna dougallii
Black-naped tern, Sterna sumatrana
Common tern, Sterna hirundo
Great crested tern, Thalasseus bergii
Chinese crested tern, Thalasseus bernsteini (A)

Tropicbirds
Order: PhaethontiformesFamily: Phaethontidae

Tropicbirds are slender white birds of tropical oceans with exceptionally long central tail feathers. Their heads and long wings have black markings.

White-tailed tropicbird, Phaethon lepturus (A)
Red-tailed tropicbird, Phaethon rubricauda (A)

Northern storm-petrels
Order: ProcellariiformesFamily: Hydrobatidae

Storm-petrels are small birds which spend most of their lives at sea, coming ashore only to breed. They feed on planktonic crustaceans and small fish picked from the surface, typically while hovering or pattering across the water. Their flight is fluttering and sometimes bat-like.

Leach's storm-petrel, Hydrobates leucorhous (A)
Swinhoe's storm-petrel, Hydrobates monorhis (A)

Shearwaters and petrels
Order: ProcellariiformesFamily: Procellariidae

The procellariids are the main group of medium-sized "true petrels", characterized by united nostrils with medium septum and a long outer functional primary.

Kermadec petrel, Pterodroma neglecta (A)
Hawaiian petrel, Pterodroma sandwichensis (A) 
Bonin petrel, Pterodroma hypoleuca (A)
Bulwer's petrel, Bulweria bulwerii (A)
Tahiti petrel, Pseudobulweria rostrata (A) 
Streaked shearwater, Calonectris leucomelas
Wedge-tailed shearwater, Ardenna pacificus 
Short-tailed shearwater, Ardenna Short-tailed  (A)

Storks
Order: CiconiiformesFamily: Ciconiidae

Storks are large, long-legged, long-necked, wading birds with long, stout bills. Storks are mute, but bill-clattering is an important mode of communication at the nest. Their nests can be large and may be reused for many years. Many species are migratory.

Black stork, Ciconia nigra (A)
Asian woolly-necked stork, Ciconia episcopus
Oriental stork, Ciconia boyciana (A)

Frigatebirds
Order: SuliformesFamily: Fregatidae

Frigatebirds are large seabirds usually found over tropical oceans. They are large, black-and-white or completely black, with long wings and deeply forked tails. The males have colored inflatable throat pouches. They do not swim or walk and cannot take off from a flat surface. Having the largest wingspan-to-body-weight ratio of any bird, they are essentially aerial, able to stay aloft for more than a week.

Lesser frigatebird, Fregata ariel
Christmas Island frigatebird, Fregata andrewsi
Great frigatebird, Fregata minor

Boobies and gannets
Order: SuliformesFamily: Sulidae

The sulids comprise the gannets and boobies. Both groups are medium to large coastal seabirds that plunge-dive for fish.

Masked booby, Sula dactylatra
Brown booby, Sula leucogaster
Red-footed booby, Sula sula

Anhingas
Order: SuliformesFamily: Anhingidae

Anhingas or darters are often called "snake-birds" because of their long thin neck, which gives a snake-like appearance when they swim with their bodies submerged. The males have black and dark-brown plumage, an erectile crest on the nape and a larger bill than the female. The females have much paler plumage especially on the neck and underparts. The darters have completely webbed feet and their legs are short and set far back on the body. Their plumage is somewhat permeable, like that of cormorants, and they spread their wings to dry after diving.

Oriental darter, Anhinga melanogaster

Cormorants and shags
Order: SuliformesFamily: Phalacrocoracidae

Phalacrocoracidae is a family of medium to large coastal, fish-eating seabirds that includes cormorants and shags. Plumage coloration varies, with the majority having mainly dark plumage, some species being black-and-white and a few being colorful.

Great cormorant, Phalacrocorax carbo

Pelicans
Order: PelecaniformesFamily: Pelecanidae

Pelicans are large water birds with a distinctive pouch under their beak. They have webbed feet with four toes.

Australian pelican, Pelecanus conspicillatus (A)
Spot-billed pelican, Pelecanus philippensis
Dalmatian pelican, Pelecanus crispus (A)

Herons, egrets, and bitterns
Order: PelecaniformesFamily: Ardeidae

The family Ardeidae contains the bitterns, herons and egrets. Herons and egrets are medium to large wading birds with long necks and legs. Bitterns tend to be shorter necked and more wary. Members of Ardeidae fly with their necks retracted, unlike other long-necked birds such as storks, ibises and spoonbills.

Great bittern, Botaurus stellaris (A)
Yellow bittern, Ixobrychus sinensis
Schrenck's bittern, Ixobrychus eurhythmus
Cinnamon bittern, Ixobrychus cinnamomeus
Black bittern, Ixobrychus flavicollis
Gray heron, Ardea cinerea
Great-billed heron, Ardea sumatrana
Purple heron, Ardea purpurea
Great egret, Ardea alba
Intermediate egret, Ardea intermedia
Chinese egret, Egretta eulophotes
Little egret, Egretta garzetta
Pacific reef-heron, Egretta sacra
Cattle egret, Bubulcus ibis
Chinese pond-heron, Ardeola bacchus (A)
Javan pond-heron, Ardeola speciosa
Striated heron, Butorides striata
Black-crowned night-heron, Nycticorax nycticorax
Nankeen night-heron, Nycticorax caledonicus
Japanese night-heron, Gorsachius goisagi
Malayan night-heron, Gorsachius melanolophus

Ibises and spoonbills
Order: PelecaniformesFamily: Threskiornithidae

Threskiornithidae is a family of large terrestrial and wading birds which includes the ibises and spoonbills. They have long, broad wings with 11 primary and about 20 secondary feathers. They are strong fliers and despite their size and weight, very capable soarers.

Glossy ibis, Plegadis falcinellus
Black-headed ibis, Threskiornis melanocephalus (A)
Eurasian spoonbill, Platalea leucorodia (A)
Black-faced spoonbill, Platalea minor (A)

Osprey
Order: AccipitriformesFamily: Pandionidae

The family Pandionidae contains only one species, the osprey. The osprey is a medium-large raptor which is a specialist fish-eater with a worldwide distribution.

Osprey, Pandion haliaetus

Hawks, eagles, and kites
Order: AccipitriformesFamily: Accipitridae

Accipitridae is a family of birds of prey, which includes hawks, eagles, kites, harriers and Old World vultures. These birds have powerful hooked beaks for tearing flesh from their prey, strong legs, powerful talons and keen eyesight.

Black-winged kite, Elanus caeruleus
Philippine honey-buzzard, Pernis steerei (E)
Oriental honey-buzzard, Pernis ptilorhynchus
Jerdon's baza, Aviceda jerdoni
Cinereous vulture, Aegypius monachus (A)
Crested serpent-eagle, Spilornis cheela
Philippine serpent-eagle, Spilornis holospilus (E)
Philippine eagle, Pithecophaga jefferyi (E)
Changeable hawk-eagle, Nisaetus cirrhatus
Philippine hawk-eagle, Nisaetus philippensis (E)
Pinsker's hawk-eagle, Nisaetus pinskeri (E)
Rufous-bellied eagle, Lophotriorchis kienerii
Gray-faced buzzard, Butastur indicus
Eastern marsh-harrier, Circus spilonotus
Pied harrier, Circus melanoleucos (A)
Crested goshawk, Accipiter trivirgatus
Shikra, Accipiter badius (A)
Chinese sparrowhawk, Accipiter soloensis
Japanese sparrowhawk, Accipiter gularis
Besra, Accipiter virgatus
Eurasian sparrowhawk, Accipiter nisus (A)
Black kite, Milvus migrans (A)
Brahminy kite, Haliastur indus
White-bellied sea-eagle, Haliaeetus leucogaster
Gray-headed fish-eagle, Haliaeetus ichthyaetus
Eastern buzzard, Buteo japonicus

Barn-owls
Order: StrigiformesFamily: Tytonidae

Barn owls are medium to large owls with large heads and characteristic heart-shaped faces. They have long strong legs with powerful talons.

Australasian grass-owl, Tyto longimembris
Oriental bay-owl, Phodilus badius

Owls
Order: StrigiformesFamily: Strigidae

The typical owls are small to large solitary nocturnal birds of prey. They have large forward-facing eyes and ears, a hawk-like beak and a conspicuous circle of feathers around each eye called a facial disk.

Collared scops-owl, Otus rufescens
Giant scops-owl, Otus gurneyi (E)
Palawan scops-owl, Otus fuliginosus (E)
Philippine scops-owl, Otus megalotis (E)
Everett's scops-owl, Otus everetti (E)
Negros scops-owl, Otus nigrorum (E)
Mindoro scops-owl, Otus mindorensis (E)
Mantanani scops-owl, Otus mantananensis (E)
Ryukyu scops-owl, Otus elegans
Mindanao scops-owl, Otus mirus (E)
Luzon scops-owl, Otus longicornis (E)
Philippine eagle-owl, Bubo philippensis (E)
Spotted wood-owl, Strix seloputo
Short-eared owl, Asio flammeus
Brown boobook, Ninox scutulata
Northern boobook, Ninox japonica
Chocolate boobook, Ninox randi (E)
Luzon boobook, Ninox philippensis 
Mindanao boobook, Ninox spilocephala (E)
Mindoro boobook, Ninox mindorensis (E)
Romblon boobook, Ninox spilonotus (E)
Cebu boobook, Ninox rumseyi (E)
Camiguin boobook, Ninox leventisi (E)
Sulu boobook, Ninox reyi (E)

Trogons
Order: TrogoniformesFamily: Trogonidae

The family Trogonidae includes trogons and quetzals. Found in tropical woodlands worldwide, they feed on insects and fruit, and their broad bills and weak legs reflect their diet and arboreal habits. Although their flight is fast, they are reluctant to fly any distance. Trogons have soft, often colorful, feathers with distinctive male and female plumage.

Philippine trogon, Harpactes ardens (E)

Hoopoes
Order: BucerotiformesFamily: Upupidae

Hoopoes have black, white and orangey-pink coloring with a large erectile crest on their head.

Eurasian hoopoe, Upupa epops (A)

Hornbills

Order: BucerotiformesFamily: Bucerotidae

Hornbills are a group of birds whose bill is shaped like a cow's horn, but without a twist, sometimes with a casque on the upper mandible. Frequently, the bill is brightly colored. 

Rufous hornbill, Buceros hydrocorax (E)
Sulu hornbill, Anthracoceros montani (E)
Palawan hornbill, Anthracoceros marchei (E)
Writhe-billed hornbill, Rhabdotorrhinus waldeni (E)
Writhed hornbill, Rhabdotorrhinus leucocephalus (E)
Visayan hornbill, Penelopides panini (E)
Luzon hornbill, Penelopides manillae (E)
Mindoro hornbill, Penelopides mindorensis (E)
Samar hornbill, Penelopides samarensis (E)
Mindanao hornbill, Penelopides affinis (E)

Kingfishers
Order: CoraciiformesFamily: Alcedinidae

Kingfishers are medium-sized birds with large heads, long, pointed bills, short legs, and stubby tails.

Common kingfisher, Alcedo atthis
Blue-eared kingfisher, Alcedo meninting
Indigo-banded kingfisher, Ceyx cyanopectus (E)
Northern silvery-kingfisher, Ceyx flumenicola (E)
Southern silvery-kingfisher, Ceyx argentatus (E)
Black-backed dwarf-kingfisher, Ceyx erithaca (A)
Rufous-backed dwarf-kingfisher, Ceyx rufidorsa
Philippine dwarf-kingfisher, Ceyx melanurus (E)
Dimorphic dwarf-kingfisher, Ceyx margaethae (E)
Stork-billed kingfisher, Pelargopsis capensis
Ruddy kingfisher, Halcyon coromanda
Brown-breasted kingfisher, Halcyon gularis (E)
Black-capped kingfisher, Halcyon pileata
Rufous-lored kingfisher, Todirhamphus winchelli (E)
Sacred kingfisher, Todirhamphus sanctus (A)
Collared kingfisher, Todirhamphus chloris
Rufous-collared kingfisher, Actenoides concretus
Spotted kingfisher, Actenoides lindsayi (E)
Blue-capped kingfisher, Actenoides hombroni (E)

Bee-eaters
Order: CoraciiformesFamily: Meropidae

The bee-eaters are a group of near passerine birds in the family Meropidae. Most species are found in Africa but others occur in southern Europe, Madagascar, Australia and New Guinea. They are characterized by richly colored plumage, slender bodies and usually elongated central tail feathers. All are colorful and have long downturned bills and pointed wings, which give them a swallow-like appearance when seen from afar.

Rufous-crowned bee-eater, Merops americanus 
Blue-tailed bee-eater, Merops philippinus

Rollers
Order: CoraciiformesFamily: Coraciidae

Rollers resemble crows in size and build, but are more closely related to the kingfishers and bee-eaters. They share the colorful appearance of those groups with blues and browns predominating. The two inner front toes are connected, but the outer toe is not.

Dollarbird, Eurystomus orientalis

Asian barbets
Order: PiciformesFamily: Megalaimidae

The Asian barbets are plump birds, with short necks and large heads. They get their name from the bristles which fringe their heavy bills. Most species are brightly colored.

Coppersmith barbet, Psilopogon haemacephalus

Woodpeckers
Order: PiciformesFamily: Picidae

Woodpeckers are small to medium-sized birds with chisel-like beaks, short legs, stiff tails and long tongues used for capturing insects. Some species have feet with two toes pointing forward and two backward, while several species have only three toes. Many woodpeckers have the habit of tapping noisily on tree trunks with their beaks.

Philippine pygmy woodpecker, Yungipicus maculatus (E)
Sulu pygmy woodpecker, Yungipicus ramsayi (E)
Luzon flameback, Chrysocolaptes haematribon (E)
Yellow-faced flameback, Chrysocolaptes xanthocephalus (E)
Buff-spotted flameback, Chrysocolaptes lucidus (E)
Red-headed flameback, Chrysocolaptes erythrocephalus (E)
Spot-throated flameback, Dinopium everetti (E)
Northern sooty-woodpecker, Mulleripicus funebris (E)
Southern sooty-woodpecker, Mulleripicus fuliginosus (E)
Great slaty woodpecker, Mulleripicus pulverulentus
White-bellied woodpecker, Dryocopus javensis

Falcons and caracaras
Order: FalconiformesFamily: Falconidae

Falconidae is a family of diurnal birds of prey. They differ from hawks, eagles and kites in that they kill with their beaks instead of their talons.

Philippine falconet, Microhierax erythrogenys (E)
Eurasian kestrel, Falco tinnunculus
Spotted kestrel, Falco moluccensis (A)
Merlin, Falco columbarius (A)
Eurasian hobby, Falco subbuteo (A)
Oriental hobby, Falco severus
Peregrine falcon, Falco peregrinus

Cockatoos
Order: PsittaciformesFamily: Cacatuidae

The cockatoos share many features with other parrots including the characteristic curved beak shape and a zygodactyl foot, with two forward toes and two backwards toes. They differ, however in a number of characteristics, including the often spectacular movable headcrest.

Philippine cockatoo, Cacatua haematuropygia (E)

Old World parrots
Order: PsittaciformesFamily: Psittaculidae

Characteristic features of parrots include a strong curved bill, an upright stance, strong legs, and clawed zygodactyl feet. Many parrots are vividly colored, and some are multi-colored. Old World parrots are found from Africa east across south and southeast Asia and Oceania to Australia and New Zealand.

Mindanao racquet-tail, Prioniturus waterstradti (E)
Luzon racquet-tail, Prioniturus montanus (E)
Blue-headed racquet-tail, Prioniturus platenae (E)
Mindoro racquet-tail, Prioniturus mindorensis (E)
Blue-winged racquet-tail, Prioniturus verticalis (E)
Green racquet-tail, Prioniturus luconensis (E)
Blue-crowned racquet-tail, Prioniturus discurus (E)
Rose-ringed parakeet, Psittacula krameri (I)
Great-billed parrot, Tanygnathus megalorynchos
Blue-naped parrot, Tanygnathus lucionensis
Azure-rumped parrot, Tanygnathus sumatranus
Guaiabero, Bolbopsittacus lunulatus (E)
Mindanao lorikeet, Saudareos johnstoniae (E)
Philippine hanging-parrot, Loriculus philippensis (E)
Camiguin hanging-parrot, Loriculus camiguinensis (E)

Asian and Grauer’s broadbills
Order: PasseriformesFamily: Eurylaimidae

The broadbills are small, brightly colored birds, which feed on fruit and also take insects in flycatcher fashion, snapping their broad bills. Their habitat is canopies of wet forests.

Wattled broadbill, Sarcophanops steerii (E)
Visayan broadbill, Sarcophanops samarensis (E)

Pittas
Order: PasseriformesFamily: Pittidae

Pittas are medium-sized by passerine standards and are stocky, with fairly long, strong legs, short tails and stout bills. Many are brightly colored. They spend the majority of their time on wet forest floors, eating snails, insects and similar invertebrates.

Whiskered pitta, Erythropitta kochi (E)
Blue-breasted pitta, Erythropitta erythrogaster (E)
Blue-winged pitta, Pitta moluccensis (A)
Fairy pitta, Pitta nympha (A)
Hooded pitta, Pitta sordida
Azure-breasted pitta, Pitta steerii (E)

Thornbills and allies
Order: PasseriformesFamily: Acanthizidae

Thornbills are small passerine birds, similar in habits to the tits.

Golden-bellied gerygone, Gerygone sulphurea

Cuckooshrikes
Order: PasseriformesFamily: Campephagidae

The cuckooshrikes are small to medium-sized passerine birds. They are predominantly grayish with white and black, although some species are brightly colored.

Fiery minivet, Pericrocotus igneus
Scarlet minivet, Pericrocotus flammeus
Ashy minivet, Pericrocotus divaricatus
Bar-bellied cuckooshrike, Coracina striata
McGregor's cuckooshrike, Coracina mcgregori (E)
Black-and-white triller, Lalage melanoleuca (E)
Pied triller, Lalage nigra
Black-winged cuckooshrike, Lalage melaschistos (A)
Blackish cuckooshrike, Analisoma coerulescens (E)
White-winged cuckooshrike, Analisoma ostenta (E)
Black-bibbed cuckooshrike, Edolisoma mindanense (E)

Whistlers and allies
Order: PasseriformesFamily: Pachycephalidae

The family Pachycephalidae includes the whistlers, shrikethrushes, and some of the pitohuis.

Yellow-bellied whistler, Pachycephala philippinensis (E)
Mangrove whistler, Pachycephala cinerea
Green-backed whistler, Pachycephala albiventris (E)
White-vented whistler, Pachycephala homeyeri (E)

Old World orioles
Order: PasseriformesFamily: Oriolidae

The Old World orioles are colorful passerine birds. They are not related to the New World orioles.

Dark-throated oriole, Oriolus xanthonotus
White-lored oriole, Oriolus albiloris (E)
Philippine oriole, Oriolus steerii (E)
Isabela oriole, Oriolus isabellae (E)
Black-naped oriole, Oriolus chinensis

Woodswallows, bellmagpies, and allies
Order: PasseriformesFamily: Artamidae

The woodswallows are soft-plumaged, somber-colored passerine birds. They are smooth, agile flyers with moderately large, semi-triangular wings.

White-breasted woodswallow, Artamus leucorynchus

Ioras
Order: PasseriformesFamily: Aegithinidae

The ioras are bulbul-like birds of open forest or thorn scrub, but whereas that group tends to be drab in coloration, ioras are sexually dimorphic, with the males being brightly plumaged in yellows and greens.

Common iora, Aegithina tiphia

Fantails
Order: PasseriformesFamily: Rhipiduridae

The fantails are small insectivorous birds which are specialist aerial feeders. There are 7 species which have been recorded in the Philippines.

Black-and-cinnamon fantail, Rhipidura nigrocinnamomea (E)
Mindanao blue-fantail, Rhipidura superciliaris 
Visayan blue-fantail, Rhipidura samarensis (E)
Tablas fantail, Rhipidura sauli (E)
Visayan fantail, Rhipidura albiventris (E)
Blue-headed fantail, Rhipidura cyaniceps (E)
Philippine pied-fantail, Rhipidura nigritorquis (E)

Drongos
Order: PasseriformesFamily: Dicruridae

The drongos are mostly black or dark gray in color, sometimes with metallic tints. They have long forked tails, and some Asian species have elaborate tail decorations. They have short legs and sit very upright when perched, like a shrike. They flycatch or take prey from the ground.

Black drongo, Dicrurus macrocercus (A)
Ashy drongo, Dicrurus leucophaeus
Crow-billed drongo, Dicrurus annectens (A)
Hair-crested drongo, Dicrurus hottentottus
Balicassiao, Dicrurus balicassius (E)
Tablas drongo, Dicrurus menagei (E)

Monarch flycatchers
Order: PasseriformesFamily: Monarchidae

The monarch flycatchers are small to medium-sized insectivorous passerines which hunt by flycatching.

Short-crested monarch, Hypothymis helenae (E)
Black-naped monarch, Hypothymis azurea
Celestial monarch, Hypothymis coelestis (E)
Blue paradise-flycatcher, Terpsiphone cyanescens (E)
Rufous paradise-flycatcher, Terpsiphone cinnamomea
Japanese paradise-flycatcher, Terpsiphone atrocaudata
Amur paradise-flycatcher, Terpsiphone incei (A)

Shrikes
Order: PasseriformesFamily: Laniidae

Shrikes are passerine birds known for their habit of catching other birds and small animals and impaling the uneaten portions of their bodies on thorns. A typical shrike's beak is hooked, like a bird of prey.

Tiger shrike, Lanius tigrinus (A)
Brown shrike, Lanius cristatus
Long-tailed shrike, Lanius schach
Mountain shrike, Lanius validirostris (E)

Crows, jays, and magpies
Order: PasseriformesFamily: Corvidae

The family Corvidae includes crows, ravens, jays, choughs, magpies, treepies, nutcrackers and ground jays. Corvids are above average in size among the Passeriformes, and some of the larger species show high levels of intelligence.

Slender-billed crow, Corvus enca
Large-billed crow, Corvus macrorhynchos

Fairy flycatchers
Order: PasseriformesFamily: Stenostiridae

Are a family of small passerine birds classified as a result of recent discoveries in molecular systematics. They are also referred to as stenostirid warblers.

Citrine canary-flycatcher, Culicicapa helianthea

Tits, chickadees, and titmice
Order: PasseriformesFamily: Paridae

The Paridae are mainly small stocky woodland species with short stout bills. Some have crests. They are adaptable birds, with a mixed diet including seeds and insects.

Elegant tit, Pardaliparus elegans (E)
Palawan tit, Pardaliparus amabilis (E)
White-fronted tit, Sittiparus semilarvatus (E)

Larks
Order: PasseriformesFamily: Alaudidae

Larks are small terrestrial birds with often extravagant songs and display flights. Most larks are fairly dull in appearance. Their food is insects and seeds. There are 91 species worldwide and 2 species which occur in the Philippines.

Horsfield’s bushlark, Mirafra javanica
Oriental skylark, Alauda gulgula

Cisticolas and allies
Order: PasseriformesFamily: Cisticolidae

The Cisticolidae are warblers found mainly in warmer southern regions of the Old World. They are generally very small birds of drab brown or gray appearance found in open country such as grassland or scrub.

Leyte plumed-warbler, Micromacronus leytensis (E)
Mindanao plumed-warbler, Micromacronus sordidus (E)
Rufous-fronted tailorbird, Orthotomus frontalis (E)
Ashy tailorbird, Orthotomus ruficeps
Rufous-tailed tailorbird, Orthotomus sericeus
Visayan tailorbird, Orthotomus castaneiceps (E)
Gray-backed tailorbird, Orthotomus derbianus (E)
Green-backed tailorbird, Orthotomus chloronotus (E)
Yellow-breasted tailorbird, Orthotomus samarensis (E)
White-browed tailorbird, Orthotomus nigriceps (E)
White-eared tailorbird, Orthotomus cinereiceps (E)
Zitting cisticola, Cisticola juncidis
Golden-headed cisticola, Cisticola exilis

Reed warblers and allies
Order: PasseriformesFamily: Acrocephalidae

The members of this family are usually rather large for "warblers". Most are rather plain olivaceous brown above with much yellow to beige below. They are usually found in open woodland, reedbeds, or tall grass. The family occurs mostly in southern to western Eurasia and surroundings, but it also ranges far into the Pacific, with some species in Africa.
	
Black-browed reed warbler, Acrocephalus bistrigiceps (A)
Streaked reed warbler, Acrocephalus sorghophilus
Oriental reed warbler, Acrocephalus orientalis
Clamorous reed warbler, Acrocephalus stentoreus

Grassbirds and allies
Order: PasseriformesFamily: Locustellidae

Locustellidae are a family of small insectivorous songbirds found mainly in Eurasia, Africa, and the Australian region. They are smallish birds with tails that are usually long and pointed, and tend to be drab brownish or buffy all over.

Cordillera ground-warbler, Robsonius rabori
Sierra Madre ground-warbler, Robsonius thompsoni (E)
Bicol ground-warbler, Robsonius sorsogonensis 
Tawny grassbird, Cincloramphus timoriensis
Striated grassbird, Megalurus palustris
Gray's grasshopper warbler, Helopsaltes fasciolatus
Sakhalin grasshopper warbler, Helopsaltes amnicola
Pallas's grasshopper warbler, Helopsaltes certhiola (A)
Middendorff's grasshopper warbler, Helopsaltes ochotensis
Lanceolated warbler, Locustella lanceolata
Long-tailed bush warbler, Locustella caudatus (E)
Benguet bush warbler, Locustella seebohmi (E)

Swallows
Order: PasseriformesFamily: Hirundinidae

The family Hirundinidae is adapted to aerial feeding. They have a slender streamlined body, long pointed wings and a short bill with a wide gape. The feet are adapted to perching rather than walking, and the front toes are partially joined at the base.

Gray-throated martin, Riparia chinensis
Bank swallow, Riparia riparia
Barn swallow, Hirundo rustica
Pacific swallow, Hirundo tahitica
Striated swallow, Cecropis striolata
Asian house-martin, Delichon dasypus (A)

Bulbuls
Order: PasseriformesFamily: Pycnonotidae

Bulbuls are medium-sized songbirds. Some are colorful with yellow, red or orange vents, cheeks, throats or supercilia, but most are drab, with uniform olive-brown to black plumage. Some species have distinct crests.

Yellow-wattled bulbul, Brachypodius urostictus (E)
Black-headed bulbul, Brachypodius melanocephalos
Light-vented bulbul, Pycnonotus sinensis (A)
Yellow-vented bulbul, Pycnonotus goiavier
Olive-winged bulbul, Pycnonotus plumosus
Ashy-fronted bulbul, Pycnonotus cinereifrons (E)
Gray-throated bulbul, Alophoixus frater (E)
Sulphur-bellied bulbul, Iole palawanensis (E)
Brown-eared bulbul, Hypsipetes amaurotis
Visayan bulbul, Hypsipetes guimarasensis (E)
Zamboanga bulbul, Hypsipetes rufigularis (E)
Yellowish bulbul, Hypsipetes everetti (E)
Mindoro bulbul, Hypsipetes mindorensis	(E)
Streak-breasted bulbul, Hypsipetes siquijorensis (E)
Philippine bulbul, Hypsipetes philippinus

Leaf warblers
Order: PasseriformesFamily: Phylloscopidae

Leaf warblers are a family of small insectivorous birds found mostly in Eurasia and ranging into Wallacea and Africa. The species are of various sizes, often green-plumaged above and yellow below, or more subdued with greyish-green to greyish-brown colors.

Yellow-browed warbler, Phylloscopus inornatus (A)
Radde's warbler, Phylloscopus schwarzi (A)
Dusky warbler, Phylloscopus fuscatus (A)
Willow warbler, Phylloscopus trochilus (A)
Lemon-throated leaf warbler, Phylloscopus cebuensis (E)
Philippine leaf warbler, Phylloscopus olivaceus (E)
Ijima's leaf warbler, Phylloscopus ijimae
Japanese leaf warbler, Phylloscopus xanthodryas
Arctic warbler, Phylloscopus borealis
Kamchatka leaf warbler, Phylloscopus examinandus
Yellow-breasted warbler, Phylloscopus montis
Negros leaf warbler, Phylloscopus nigrorum (E)

Bush warblers and allies
Order: PasseriformesFamily: Scotocercidae

The members of this family are found throughout Africa, Asia, and Polynesia. Their taxonomy is in flux, and some authorities place some genera in other families.

Asian stubtail, Urosphena squameiceps (A)
Yellow-bellied warbler, Abroscopus superciliaris
Mountain tailorbird, Phyllergates cucullatus
Rufous-headed tailorbird, Phyllergates heterolaemus (E)
Philippine bush warbler, Horornis seebohmi (E)
Japanese bush warbler, Horornis diphone
Manchurian bush warbler, Horornis borealis
Aberrant bush warbler, Horornis flavolivaceus

White-eyes, yuhinas, and allies 
Order: PasseriformesFamily: Zosteropidae

The white-eyes are small and mostly undistinguished, their plumage above being generally some dull color like greenish-olive, but some species have a white or bright yellow throat, breast or lower parts, and several have buff flanks. As their name suggests, many species have a white ring around each eye.

Chestnut-faced babbler, Zosterornis whiteheadi	(E)
Luzon striped-babbler, Zosterornis striatus (E)
Panay striped-babbler, Zosterornis latistriatus (E)
Negros striped-babbler, Zosterornis nigrorum (E)
Palawan striped-babbler, Zosterornis hypogrammicus (E)
Mindanao white-eye, Heleia goodfellowi (E)
Golden-crowned babbler, Sterrhoptilus dennistouni (E)
Black-crowned babbler, Sterrhoptilus nigrocapitatus (E)
Rusty-crowned babbler, Sterrhoptilus capitalis (E)
Flame-templed babbler, Dasycrotapha speciosa (E)
Visayan pygmy-babbler, Dasycrotapha pygmaea (E)
Mindanao pygmy-babbler, Dasycrotapha plateni (E)
Warbling white-eye, Zosterops japonicus
Lowland white-eye, Zosterops meyeni (E)
Everett's white-eye, Zosterops everetti
Yellowish white-eye, Zosterops nigrorum (E)

Tree-babblers, scimitar-babblers, and allies 
Order: PasseriformesFamily: Timaliidae

The babblers, or timaliids, are somewhat diverse in size and coloration, but are characterized by soft fluffy plumage.

Pin-striped tit-babbler, Macronus gularis
Bold-striped tit-babbler, Macronus bornensis		
Brown tit-babbler, Macronus striaticeps (E)

Ground babblers and allies
Order: PasseriformesFamily: Pellorneidae

These small to medium-sized songbirds have soft fluffy plumage but are otherwise rather diverse. Members of the genus Illadopsis are found in forests, but some other genera are birds of scrublands.

Palawan babbler, Malacopteron palawanense (E)
Ashy-headed babbler, Malacocincla cinereiceps (E)
Striated wren-babbler, Ptilocichla mindanensis (E)
Falcated wren-babbler, Ptilocichla falcata (E)

Nuthatches
Order: PasseriformesFamily: Sittidae

Nuthatches are small woodland birds. They have the unusual ability to climb down trees head first, unlike other birds which can only go upwards. Nuthatches have big heads, short tails and powerful bills and feet.

Velvet-fronted nuthatch, Sitta frontalis
Sulphur-billed nuthatch, Sitta oenochlamys (E)

Starlings
Order: PasseriformesFamily: Sturnidae

Starlings are small to medium-sized passerine birds. Their flight is strong and direct and they are very gregarious. Their preferred habitat is fairly open country. They eat insects and fruit. Plumage is typically dark with a metallic sheen.

Stripe-sided rhabdornis, Rhabdornis mysticalis (E)
Long-billed rhabdornis, Rhabdornis grandis (E)
Stripe-breasted rhabdornis, Rhabdornis inornatus 
Visayan rhabdornis, Rhabdornis rabori (E)
Asian glossy starling, Aplonis panayensis
Short-tailed starling, Aplonis minor
Apo myna, Basilornis miranda (E)
Coleto, Sarcops calvus (E)
Common hill myna, Gracula religiosa
European starling, Sturnus vulgaris (A)
Rosy starling, Pastor roseus (A)
Daurian starling, Agropsar sturninus (A)
Chestnut-cheeked starling, Agropsar philippensis
White-shouldered starling, Sturnia sinensis (A)
Chestnut-tailed starling, Sturnia malabarica (A)
Red-billed starling, Spodiopsar sericeus (A)
White-cheeked starling, Spodiopsar cineraceus (A)
Common myna, Acridotheres tristis (A)
Crested myna, Acridotheres cristatellus (I)

Thrushes and allies
Order: PasseriformesFamily: Turdidae

The thrushes are a group of passerine birds that occur mainly in the Old World. They are plump, soft plumaged, small to medium-sized insectivores or sometimes omnivores, often feeding on the ground. Many have attractive songs.

Sunda thrush, Zoothera andromedae
White's thrush, Zoothera aurea
Siberian thrush, Geokichla sibirica (A)
Ashy thrush, Geokichla cinerea (E)
Chestnut-capped thrush, Geokichla interpres
Chinese blackbird, Turdus mandarinus (A)
Eyebrowed thrush, Turdus obscurus
Brown-headed thrush, Turdus chrysolaus
Pale thrush, Turdus pallidus
Island thrush, Turdus poliocephalus
Dusky thrush, Turdus eunomus (A)
Naumann's thrush, Turdus naumanni (A)

Old World flycatchers
Order: PasseriformesFamily: Muscicapidae

Old World flycatchers are a large group of small passerine birds native to the Old World. They are mainly small arboreal insectivores. The appearance of these birds is highly varied, but they mostly have weak songs and harsh calls.

Gray-streaked flycatcher, Muscicapa griseisticta
Dark-sided flycatcher, Muscicapa sibirica
Ferruginous flycatcher, Muscicapa ferruginea
Asian brown flycatcher, Muscicapa dauurica
Ashy-breasted flycatcher, Muscicapa randi (E)
Spotted flycatcher, Muscicapa striata (A)
Philippine magpie-robin, Copsychus mindanensis (E)
White-browed shama, Copsychus luzoniensis (E)
Visayan shama, Copsychus superciliaris (E)
White-vented shama, Copsychus niger (E)
Black shama, Copsychus cebuensis (E)
Blue-breasted flycatcher, Cyornis herioti (E)
Palawan blue flycatcher, Cyornis lemprieri (E)
Mangrove blue flycatcher, Cyornis rufigastra
Chestnut-tailed jungle flycatcher, Cyornis ruficauda
Blue-and-white flycatcher, Cyanoptila cyanomelana
Zappey's flycatcher, Cyanoptila cumatilis
Verditer flycatcher, Eumyias thalassinus (A)
Turquoise flycatcher, Eumyias panayensis
Bagobo robin, Leonardina woodi (E)
Rusty-flanked jungle-flycatcher, Vauriella insignis (E)
Negros jungle-flycatcher, Vauriella albigularis (E)
Mindanao jungle-flycatcher, Vauriella goodfellowi (E)
Philippine shortwing, Brachypteryx poliogyna (E)
Siberian blue robin, Larvivora cyane
Bluethroat, Luscinia svecica (A)
Siberian rubythroat, Calliope calliope
Yellow-rumped flycatcher, Ficedula zanthopygia (A)
Narcissus flycatcher, Ficedula narcissina
Mugimaki flycatcher, Ficedula mugimaki
Little pied flycatcher, Ficedula westermanni
Taiga flycatcher, Ficedula albicilla (A)
Palawan flycatcher, Ficedula platenae (E)
Furtive flycatcher, Ficedula disposita (E)
Little slaty flycatcher, Ficedula basilanica (E)
Cryptic flycatcher, Ficedula crypta (E)
Bundok flycatcher, Ficedula luzoniensis (E)
Luzon redstart, Phoenicurus bicolor (E)
Daurian redstart, Phoenicurus auroreus (A)
Blue rock-thrush, Monticola solitarius
Snowy-browed flycatcher, Ficedula hyperythra 
Amur stonechat, Saxicola stejnegeri
Pied bushchat, Saxicola caprata
Northern wheatear, Oenanthe oenanthe (A)

Waxwings
Order: PasseriformesFamily: Bombycillidae

The waxwings are a group of passerine birds with soft silky plumage and unique red tips to some of the wing feathers. These tips look like sealing wax and give the group its name. These are arboreal birds of northern forests. They live on insects in summer and berries in winter.

Japanese waxwing, Bombycilla japonica (A)

Flowerpeckers
Order: PasseriformesFamily: Dicaeidae

The flowerpeckers are very small, stout, often brightly colored birds, with short tails, short thick curved bills and tubular tongues.

Olive-backed flowerpecker, Prionochilus olivaceus (E)
Palawan flowerpecker, Prionochilus plateni (E)
Thick-billed flowerpecker, Dicaeum agile
Whiskered flowerpecker, Dicaeum proprium (E)
Olive-capped flowerpecker, Dicaeum nigrilore (E)
Flame-crowned flowerpecker, Dicaeum anthonyi (E)
Bicolored flowerpecker, Dicaeum bicolor (E)
Cebu flowerpecker, Dicaeum quadricolor (E)
Red-keeled flowerpecker, Dicaeum australe (E)
Black-belted flowerpecker, Dicaeum haematostictum (E)
Scarlet-collared flowerpecker, Dicaeum retrocinctum (E)
Orange-bellied flowerpecker, Dicaeum trigonostigma
White-bellied flowerpecker, Dicaeum hypoleucum (E)
Pygmy flowerpecker, Dicaeum pygmaeum (E)
Fire-breasted flowerpecker, Dicaeum ignipectus

Sunbirds and spiderhunters
Order: PasseriformesFamily: Nectariniidae

The sunbirds and spiderhunters are very small passerine birds which feed largely on nectar, although they will also take insects, especially when feeding young. Flight is fast and direct on their short wings. Most species can take nectar by hovering like a hummingbird, but usually perch to feed.

Brown-throated sunbird, Anthreptes malacensis
Gray-throated sunbird, Anthreptes griseigularis
Purple-throated sunbird, Leptocoma sperata (E)
Copper-throated sunbird, Leptocoma calcostetha
Olive-backed sunbird, Cinnyris jugularis
Lovely sunbird, Aethopyga shelleyi (E)
Magnificent sunbird, Aethopyga magnifica (E)
Handsome sunbird, Aethopyga bella (E)
Flaming sunbird, Aethopyga flagrans 
Maroon-naped sunbird, Aethopyga guimarasensis
Metallic-winged sunbird, Aethopyga pulcherrima (E)
Mountain sunbird, Aethopyga jefferyi (E)
Bohol sunbird, Aethopyga decorosa (E)
Lina's sunbird, Aethopyga linaraborae (E)
Gray-hooded sunbird, Aethopyga primigenia (E)
Apo sunbird, Aethopyga boltoni 
Tboli sunbird, Aethopyga tibolii (E)
Orange-tufted spiderhunter, Arachnothera flammifera
Pale spiderhunter, Arachnothera dilutior (E)
Naked-faced spiderhunter, Arachnothera clarae (E)

Fairy-bluebirds
Order: PasseriformesFamily: Irenidae

The fairy-bluebirds are bulbul-like birds of open forest or thorn scrub. The males are dark-blue and the females a duller green.

Asian fairy-bluebird, Irena puella
Philippine fairy-bluebird, Irena cyanogaster (E)

Leafbirds
Order: PasseriformesFamily: Chloropseidae

The leafbirds are small, bulbul-like birds. The males are brightly plumaged, usually in greens and yellows.

Philippine leafbird, Chloropsis flavipennis (E)
Yellow-throated leafbird, Chloropsis palawanensis (E)

Waxbills and allies
Order: PasseriformesFamily: Estrildidae

The estrildid finches are small passerine birds of the Old World tropics and Australasia. They are gregarious and often colonial seed eaters with short thick but pointed bills. They are all similar in structure and habits, but have wide variation in plumage colors and patterns.

Tawny-breasted parrotfinch, Erythrura hyperythra
Pin-tailed parrotfinch, Erythrura prasina
Green-faced parrotfinch, Erythrura viridifacies (E)
Red-eared parrotfinch, Erythrura coloria (E)
Dusky munia, Lonchura fuscans
Scaly-breasted munia, Lonchura punctulata
White-bellied munia, Lonchura leucogastra
Chestnut munia, Lonchura atricapilla
Java sparrow, Padda oryzivora (I)

Old World sparrows
Order: PasseriformesFamily: Passeridae

Old World sparrows are small passerine birds. In general, sparrows tend to be small, plump, brown or gray birds with short tails and short powerful beaks. Sparrows are seed eaters, but they also consume small insects.

Cinnamon ibon, Hypocryptadius cinnamomeus (E)
Eurasian tree sparrow, Passer montanus

Wagtails and pipits
Order: PasseriformesFamily: Motacillidae

Motacillidae is a family of small passerine birds with medium to long tails. They include the wagtails, longclaws and pipits. They are slender, ground feeding insectivores of open country.

Forest wagtail, Dendronanthus indicus
Gray wagtail, Motacilla cinerea
Eastern yellow wagtail, Motacilla tschutschensis 
Citrine wagtail, Motacilla citreola (A)
White wagtail, Motacilla alba
Richard's pipit, Anthus richardi (A)
Paddyfield pipit, Anthus rufulus
Olive-backed pipit, Anthus hodgsoni
Pechora pipit, Anthus gustavi
Red-throated pipit, Anthus cervinus
American pipit, Anthus rubescens (A)

Finches, euphonias, and allies
Order: PasseriformesFamily: Fringillidae

Finches are seed-eating passerine birds, that are small to moderately large and have a strong beak, usually conical and in some species very large. All have twelve tail feathers and nine primaries. These birds have a bouncing flight with alternating bouts of flapping and gliding on closed wings, and most sing well.

Brambling, Fringilla montifringilla (A)
Hawfinch, Coccothraustes coccothraustes (A)
Yellow-billed grosbeak, Eophona migratoria (A)
Japanese grosbeak, Eophona personata (A)
Common rosefinch, Carpodacus erythrinus (A)
White-cheeked bullfinch, Pyrrhula leucogenis (E)
Red crossbill, Loxia curvirostra
Mountain serin, Chrysocorythus estherae
Eurasian siskin, Spinus spinus (A)

Longspurs and snow buntings
Order: PasseriformesFamily: Calcariidae

The Calcariidae are a group of passerine birds which had been traditionally grouped with the New World sparrows, but differ in a number of respects and are usually found in open grassy areas.

Lapland longspur, Calcarius lapponicus (A)

Old World buntings
Order: PasseriformesFamily: Emberizidae

The emberizids are a large family of passerine birds. They are seed-eating birds with distinctively shaped bills. Many emberizid species have distinctive head patterns.

Black-headed bunting, Emberiza melanocephala (A)
Chestnut-eared bunting, Emberiza fucata (A)
Yellow-breasted bunting, Emberiza aureola (A)
Little bunting, Emberiza pusilla (A)
Yellow bunting, Emberiza sulphurata
Black-faced bunting, Emberiza spodocephala    (A)

See also
List of birds
Lists of birds by region

References

Philippines
Philippines
'
Birds